Aviation Composite Technology (ACT) is an aircraft manufacturer formed in the Philippines in 1990.  It was established to produce the Apache 1 for the Philippines military and police service.

References 

Aircraft manufacturers of the Philippines